Daebu Island (Daebudo) is an island in the Yellow Sea, within the municipal borders of Ansan city, Gyeonggi province. It has a population of roughly 7,114 people and an area of 41.98 km². Due to rising mudflats, the island has merged with neighbouring Seongam-do (Hangeul:선감도) and Tan-do (탄도). Administratively, the island today is divided into five dong: Daebubuk-dong (대부북동), Daebunam-dong (대부남동), Daebudong-dong (대부동동), Seongam-dong (선감동) and Pungdo-dong (풍도동). The predominant industries are tourism and fishing. The island is connected (via Seongam-do and Tan-do) to the mainland in the south-east by road bridges, to Hyeong-do (형도) (and thence the mainland) in the north-east by several routes due to land reclamation efforts, and to Seonjae-do (선재도) (and thence Yeongheung Island (영흥도) and others) to the west by a further road bridge.

History

During the Goryeo and Joseon Dynasties, Daebu Island was included in the old jurisdiction of Namyang. On March 1, 1914, it was transferred to Bucheon, and on July 1, 1973 responsibility was transferred to Ongjin County (which later became part of Incheon Metropolitan City). On December 26, 1994 the island was moved into the jurisdiction of Ansan, where it remains today.

Education
Daebu Island has three kindergartens, three elementary schools, one middle school and a high school. The island (specifically Seongam-do) is also home to the Gyeonggi English Village's Ansan Camp, an immersion village for students from Gyeonggi Province.

See also
Islands of South Korea
Geography of South Korea

References

External links 

 Daebu-dong Citizens' Centre
 Ansan City Council
 Gyeonggi English Village - Ansan Camp

Islands of Gyeonggi Province
Ansan
Islands of the Yellow Sea
Ramsar sites in South Korea